Trillium cuneatum, the little sweet betsy, also known as whip-poor-will flower, large toadshade, purple toadshade, and bloody butcher, is a species of flowering plant in the family Melanthiaceae. It is native to the southeastern United States but is especially common in a region that extends from southern Kentucky through central Tennessee to northern Alabama. In its native habitat, this perennial plant flowers from early March to late April (depending on latitude). It is the largest of the eastern sessile-flowered trilliums.

Description
Trillium cuneatum has three broad, mottled leaves surrounding a sessile, banana-scented flower. The petals are erect and either maroon, bronze, green, or yellow in color.

Taxonomy
Trillium cuneatum was first described by Rafinesque in 1840. The specific epithet cuneatum, which means "narrow below and wide above, wedge-shaped", refers to the tapered shape of the basal half of its flower petal.

, Kew's Plants of the World Online accepts no infraspecific names for Trillium cuneatum. Some authorities recognize the name Trillium cuneatum f. luteum , a form marked by the absence of purple pigments from all floral parts. It occurs in the midst of purple-flowered plants throughout the range of the species.
Although both have yellow (or greenish-yellow) petals, Trillium cuneatum f. luteum  is not regarded as the taxonomic or genetic equivalent of Trillium luteum 

Trillium cuneatum has long been known for its morphological variability between (and even within) geographically distributed populations. Phylogenetic analysis suggests that T. cuneatum may be better understood as a species complex that includes three currently-recognized species (T. cuneatum in a stricter sense, T. maculatum, and T. luteum), two proposed species (Trillium freemanii and Trillium radiatum), and several other unnamed and incompletely delineated clades.

Distribution and habitat
Trillium cuneatum is endemic to the southeastern United States, ranging from Kentucky southward to southern Mississippi, and to the eastern coast of South Carolina. It is native to Alabama, Georgia, Kentucky, Mississippi, North Carolina, South Carolina, and Tennessee. It has been widely introduced elsewhere, with naturalized populations in Illinois, Maryland, Michigan, and Pennsylvania. There are hundreds of observations of T. cuneatum made by citizen scientists outside of its native range, in more than a dozen states, but especially in Virginia, Pennsylvania, Maryland, and New York.

Trillium cuneatum prefers to grow in rich soils in mostly upland woods, especially limestone soils but also at less calcareous sites.

Ecology
In the southern part of its range, from Mississippi to Georgia, Trillium cuneatum begins to flower in early March, with peak flowering occurring around mid-March. In its northernmost populations, flowering occurs in April. In the vicinity of Nashville, Tennessee, fruits were observed to ripen and drop off between July 1 and July 10.

In general, Trillium species are myrmecochorous, that is, ants facilitate seed dispersal in most (if not all) species. Since each seed of T. cuneatum has an attached elaiosome, presumably its seeds are dispersed by ants as well.

Bibliography

References

External links
Biodiversity Information Serving Our Nation (BISON) occurrence data and maps for Trillium cuneatum

cuneatum
Flora of the Southeastern United States
Flora of the Appalachian Mountains
Flora of Illinois
Flora of Pennsylvania
Endemic flora of the United States
Plants described in 1840
Taxa named by Constantine Samuel Rafinesque